Paratectonatica is a genus of small to medium-sized predatory sea snails, marine gastropods in the subfamily Naticinae of the family Naticidae, the moon snails.

Species
 Paratectonatica tigrina (Röding, 1798)

References

External links
 Azuma M. (1961). Studies on the radulae of Japanese Naticidae (1). Venus. 21(2): 196-204, pls 12-15

Naticidae